The United Keetoowah Band of Cherokee Indians in Oklahoma ( or , abbreviated United Keetoowah Band or UKB) is a federally recognized tribe of Cherokee Native Americans headquartered in Tahlequah, Oklahoma. According to the UKB website, its members are mostly descendants of "Old Settlers" or "Western Cherokee," those Cherokee who migrated from the Southeast to present-day Arkansas and Oklahoma around 1817. Some reports estimate that Old Settlers began migrating west by 1800. This was before the forced relocation of Cherokee by the United States in the late 1830s under the Indian Removal Act.

Although politically the UKB is not associated with the Trail of Tears, many of the members have direct ancestors who completed the journey in 1838/1839. Many UKB members are traditionalists and Baptists.

Government

Today the UKB has over 14,300 members, with 13,300 living within the state of Oklahoma. Joe Bunch is the current Chief.

Assistant Chief is Jeff Wacoche. Joyce Fourkiller-Hawk serves as the tribal Secretary and Sonja Ummerteskee Gourd is the tribe's Treasurer. Tribal officers hold four-year terms while tribal council members are elected to two-year terms. The election calendars parallel the United States' national election calendar (Mid-terms and Presidential).

Economic development
The tribe owns and operates Keetoowah Construction in Tahlequah, and the Keetoowah Cherokee Treatment Center in Tulsa, Oklahoma. They have an arts and crafts gallery, showcasing members' work.

They own and operate the Keetoowah Cherokee Casino, with over 500 gaming machines, in Tahlequah. The UKB issue their own tribal vehicle tags. Their estimated annual economic impact is $267 million. They host an annual homecoming festival over the first weekend of October.

Origins 
The word Keetoowah (Kituwa) is the name of an ancient Cherokee mother town and earthwork mound in the eastern homeland of the Cherokee. Kituwah also is considered by the Cherokee to be their original name. The UKB's original land claims include all or parts of Alabama, the Carolinas, Georgia, Kentucky, Tennessee, Virginia, and West Virginia. Following the western movement of the Cherokee, UKB traditional territories include the above-mentioned states with the addition of Arkansas, Illinois, Kansas, Missouri, Oklahoma, and Texas.

History 
The UKB members are composed primarily of descendants of the "Old Settlers," Cherokee who settled in present-day Arkansas and Oklahoma around 1817. They were well established before most of the Cherokee were forcibly relocated by the United States government from the Southeast to Indian Territory in what became known as the 1838 Trail of Tears.

By the 1880s, all Cherokee people faced increased pressure by the US government for assimilation. During the late 19th and early 20th centuries, Cherokee and other Native American children were sent to Indian boarding schools away from home for their education: they were expected to speak only English, were generally prohibited from speaking their own languages, and were expected to adopt Christianity rather than practice native spirituality. The US federal government unilaterally closed and seized Cherokee and other Native American governmental and public institutions through the 1898 Curtis Act, the Dawes Act and the 1906 Five Civilized Tribes Act. Under this legislation, they broke up communal tribal holdings and allotted plots of land to individual households, intended to be developed according to the European-American model of subsistence farming.

The Dawes Commission was tasked to extinguish Native American land claims and break up tribal governments by allotting what was considered communal tribal lands. By assigning plots to individual households among the Five Civilized Tribes, they intended to encourage the European-American model of subsistence farming. Afterward the US government appointed certain Cherokee chiefs to administer tribal lands and holdings, rather than allowing the people to continue with their practice of hereditary chiefs.

History of Federal recognition 

Under the Curtis Act of 1898, the government of the Cherokee Nation was dissolved in 1906, in spite of the resistance of many of its members. The only remnant left was the office of the Principal Chief, held by William Charles Rogers. He had been deposed in 1905 by the National Council for cooperating in the tribe's dissolution. He was replaced with Frank J. Boudinot (who was also the leader of the Keetoowah Nighthawk Society).

The next year, the US government re-appointed Rogers and directed him to manage land sales. He held office until 1914. After that the US government did not appoint a chief and the position was dormant.

Prior to World War II, the administration of President Franklin D. Roosevelt worked to strengthen Native American tribes by encouraging them to reconstitute their governments and adopt an electoral process. Congress passed the Indian Reorganization Act (1934). The state legislature passed the Oklahoma Indian Welfare Act (OIWA, 1936); both were considered part of the Indian New Deal to support tribes' reorganizing their governments. The Cherokee began to organize on their own terms. In the meantime, the President of the United States officially appointed Principal Chiefs for the Cherokee; these appointments were made through the Department of Interior's Bureau of Indian Affairs.
	
The UKB ratified their constitution and by-laws on October 3, 1950. The tribe was federally recognized in 1950 under the Oklahoma Indian Welfare Act. Early elected leaders of the UKB were Levi Gritts, followed by John Hitcher, and the Reverend Jim Pickup, who served in the post-World War II era.

Cherokee language
The UKB have struggled to maintain use and education in the Cherokee language. As of 2018, only 101 people in the UKB were counted as being fluent, with most speakers either in the grandparent generation or older. In 2019, the Tri-Council of Cherokee tribes declared a state of emergency for the language due to the threat of it going extinct, and called for the enhancement of revitalization programs.

Conflict with the Cherokee Nation of Oklahoma
After the federal dissolution of the Old Cherokee Nation under the Dawes Commission and allotments, Native American land claims in Indian Territory were extinguished and Oklahoma was admitted as a state. Indians listed on the Dawes Commission rolls and other rolls were effectively left without political representation.

In the late 1940s, the United Keetoowah Band's claim to recognition as a tribe was probed according to criteria influenced by John Collier, who led the Bureau of Indian Affairs, and Felix S. Cohen.  Writer D'Arcy McNickle argued that the Cherokee Nation no longer existed in any form except to sign over Indian lands. He suggested that the UKB be granted federal acknowledgment based on its authenticity and connection to the traditional ways, including maintenance of the language and ceremonies.

After 1947, the UKB was the federally recognized organization by which all the Cherokee people received federal assistance and were dealt with on federal programs. The UKB was able to secure federal funds for the Cherokee Nation Complex, which today houses the government of the Cherokee Nation of Oklahoma (CNO), also federally recognized in the late 20th century. The UKB also started the Cherokee National Holiday, in conjunction with the Principal Chief's office. The Cherokee Nation Housing Authority was begun using UKB's federally recognized status.

Even the casino enterprises, which have for decades given the Cherokee Nation of Oklahoma a motive to try to destroy or "de-recognize" the UKB and its membership, emerged from precedent set by the cooperation of the UKB.

The Cherokee Nation of Oklahoma received approval of their constitution and federal recognition in 1975. The two nations pursued independent paths; the CNO had many more members and asserted political power in the region.  The CNO evicted the UKB from the offices at the tribal complex in Tahlequah, which had originally been acquired  through the United Keetoowah Band's government-to-government relationship with the United States.

The CNO administrations of Wilma Mankiller and Chad "Corntassel" Smith have had many conflicts with UKB leadership. Smith was a member of the UKB, but due to these issues, the tribe revoked his membership in 2005.

UKB membership
The United Keetoowah Band maintains a one-quarter-blood requirement for members. It requires all members to have verifiable Cherokee descent either from a person or people on the Dawes Roll or the UKB Base Roll of 1949.

Beginning in the 1970s, the UKB made some people honorary, adopted and associate members, to recognize their services to the nation. This continued an older practice of Keetoowah adoption or naturalization of captives and friends dating to the 19th century. Former President Bill Clinton is a notable associate member. Given the problems in the 21st century of persons trying to gain benefits by claiming distant Cherokee or UKB ancestry, the tribe no longer practices honorary membership.

Ward Churchill, a former Professor of Ethnic Studies at the University of Colorado, had long claimed to be of Cherokee descent and made his reputation on promoting Native American issues and an activist Native American view. He was revealed to have no such ancestry. Then he claimed to be an honorary associate member in the UKB, but the tribe has rejected this claim as fraudulent.

Legal issues

Gaming casinos
In the late 20th century, several tribes began to develop gaming facilities on their own sovereign or trust lands, and in consultation with affected states. Such enterprises have raised revenues often used for development and welfare.

The State of Oklahoma has sued the UKB in federal court for operating what it describes as illegal gaming facilities, as they are not on Bureau of Indian Affairs-approved tribal trust lands. According to briefs submitted by the Cherokee Nation, the UKB own no tribal lands in federal trust. The lawsuit is pending in the federal courts in Oklahoma. It has been remanded to the National Indian Gaming Commission for review.

During the State of Oklahoma lawsuit pertaining to the UKB's alleged illegal casino operations for a casino that the tribe has been operating for approximately 19 years, the UKB was accused of attempting to sue the Cherokee Nation. The Cherokee Nation said the UKB had sued to demand cession of tribal land allotments to them in order to build casinos. These lawsuits were dismissed.

Land claims
The UKB has sued the United States for a share of the proceeds under HR-3534, a bill that required the United States to compensate the Cherokee Nation and two other Oklahoma tribes for claims to the disclaimed drybed lands of the Arkansas River. The legislation set aside ten percent of each tribe's share of the settlement for other claimant tribes; it afforded other claimant tribes an opportunity to file claims within 180 days of the legislation. The UKB filed suit against the United States in the Court of Claims. The Cherokee Nation moved to intervene and to dismiss the UKB suit. It contended that the Cherokee Nation is an indispensable party and that it cannot be joined in the litigation because of its sovereign immunity. The Court of Claims granted both of the Cherokee Nation's motions.

On April 14, 2006, on appeal, the United States sided with the UKB against the Cherokee Nation's request for dismissal. The Court of Federal Claims heard the appeal on November 8, 2006.

In June 2004, the UKB requested that the BIA take into trust land which the tribe owned on a fee basis, a  Community Services Parcel. The case has been studied and the request was originally denied, but the UKB appealed. In May 2011, the BIA finally announced its decision to take into trust for the UKB  of land in Tahlequah. This land includes several of its community centers and the sacred dance ground. The tribe will no longer be landless.

Notable UKB members
Robert J. Conley (b. 1940), historian and novelist
Mel Cornshucker (b. 1952), ceramic artist
David Cornsilk, legal activist and genealogist
 Cecil Dick (1915–1992), Flatstyle painter and muralist
 Franklin Gritts (1914–1996), Flatsyle painter and educator
Archie Sam (1914–1986), Natchez/Cherokee/Muscogee Creek traditionalist, stomp dance leader, and cultural historian
Virginia Stroud (b. 1951), (United Keetoowah Band/Muscogee Creek), artist and former Miss Indian America

Education
In April, 2019, the tribe chartered Bacone College in Muskogee, Oklahoma as its tribal college.

See also 

Original Keetoowah Society
Cherokee Immersion School

Notes

References

 Leeds, Georgia Rae. "The United Keetoowah Band of Cherokee Indians in Oklahoma." American University Studies. Series IX, Vol. 184, 199  pages.
 Meredith, Howard L. Bartley Milam: Principal Chief of the Cherokee Nation. Muskogee, OK: Indian University Press, 1985.

External links
 Official website 
 "United Keetoowah Band", Encyclopedia of Oklahoma History and Culture website
 Allogan Slagle, "Burning Phoenix", The People's Paths 
 Corporate Charter of the United Keetoowah Band

 
 
Native American tribes in Oklahoma
Federally recognized tribes in the United States
Cherokee-speaking countries and territories